Paddy Barry may refer to:

Paddy Barry (Limerick hurler) (1895–1967)
Paddy Barry (Sarsfield's hurler) (1928–2000)
Paddy Barry (St Vincent's hurler) (born 1941)
Paddy Barry (footballer), Irish soccer international

See also
Patrick Barry (disambiguation)